Vengo A Cobrar is the fourth studio album by American rapper Mellow Man Ace. It was released on June 8, 2004 via Dimelo Records. The seventeen-track record featured guest appearances from Sen Dog, Big Chill, E-Step, Cuban Pete, Lance Robinson, Saint Dog, and Orquesta Tabaco Y Ron.

Track listing

Personnel
 Bronek Wroblewski – producer
 Lance Robinson – composer (track 9)
 Mark Chalecki – mastering
 Nissim J. Baly – artwork, design, executive producer
 Ulpiano Sergio Reyes – main artist
 Vachik Aghaniantz – mixing

References

2004 albums
Mellow Man Ace albums